Portland Men's Roller Derby is an open gender flat track roller derby league in Portland, Oregon, United States. The league was established in 2009.

In December 2011, the league was accepted as a member of the Men's Roller Derby Association.

References

External links
Portland Men's Roller Derby (official website)

Sports in Portland, Oregon
Men's roller derby
Roller derby leagues in Oregon
Roller derby leagues established in 2009
2009 establishments in Oregon